Yojaver Brito (born 3 December 1995) is a Dominican handball player for Simon Bolivar Handball and the Dominican Republic national team.

Individual Awards and recognitions
2017 Nor.Ca. Women's Handball Championship: All Star Team Right Wing

References

1995 births
Living people
Dominican Republic female handball players
Central American and Caribbean Games gold medalists for the Dominican Republic
Competitors at the 2018 Central American and Caribbean Games
Handball players at the 2019 Pan American Games
Pan American Games competitors for the Dominican Republic
Central American and Caribbean Games medalists in handball